Csurgó (formerly Somogy-Csurgó;  or ) is a town in Somogy County, Hungary, and the seat of Csurgó District.

The settlement is part of the Balatonboglár wine region.

Geography
It lies on the southwestern part of Somogy County, near the Hungarian-Croatian border. Here meets the Öreghegy and the Újhegy in Northwest, the Inner Somogy Hill Range in the Northeast and the River Drava in the South. The town can be approached by car or train. It lies on the Dombóvár-Gyékényes Railway Line.

History
The territory of Csurgó was already inhabited in prehistoric times according to archaeological finds. During the Roman times this place was on the road which connected Pannonia province to the Adriatic Sea. Csurgó was first mentioned in the establishing charter of the Abbey of Zalavár in 1019 when Saint Stephen of Hungary donated the village and its goods to the Benedictine monks. During the Árpád era it was one of the lands of the free royal swineherds. Then later the sister of Béla III, Margit gave it to the Crusaders. They settled on the so-called Felső-Csurgó part of the village on a hill in a marsh. Then later the Order of Malta arrived on that place. The Johanniter Order founded their first monastery between 1217 and 1226 which served as a fortress, hospital and church. According to the legends Béla IV fled through Csurgó after the Battle of Muhi where he stayed for a night and drank from the Holy Mary Well. Csurgó was given market town rights on September 28, 1405 by Sigismund Luxemburg. Its castle was built in the 15th century but was demolished in the 18th century. There was also a church built in the 13th century which was repeatedly rebuilt since 1731. Sebestyén Tinódi Lantos moved here in 1543 and stayed for two years after his lord was captured by the Turks. During the Turkish occupation the town lost most of its residents.

In the beginning of the 18th century Csurgó was almost empty and belonged to the Festetics family who decided to revive the settlement. They allowed Hungarians, Germans, Croats and Slovaks to settle in the village. Its Calvinist secondary school was founded in 1792. Also the famous Hungarian poet, Mihály Csokonai Vitéz taught there between the May 26, 1799 and February 17, 1800. He finished his well-known work, Dorottya there. between 1804 and 1809 Csurgó belonged to György Festetics.

Csurgó became market town again in 1850. Since 1896 he operates the first training school in Somogy County. The town became seat of the Csurgó District in 1871. The section of the train line connecting Budapest to Fiume (today Rijeka, Croatia) near Csurgó was finished in 1872. It became third time a town in 1989.

Main sights
 Town Museum
 Szentlélek-templom - built in the 13th century, later rebuilt in Baroque style, the tower is in Romantic style
 Csokonai Reformed Secondary School - built in the 18th century in Eclecticism
 Csokonai Community House
 Town Library
 Sport Hall
 Meller Mansion - built in the 19th century in Eclecticism with Secession decoration
 Basa Well - built in the 16th century by Damat Ibrahim Pasha
 Lake Zis - famous recreational and hiking spot

Culture
The Hungarian folk song A juhásznak jól van dolga was collected in Alsok (part of Csurgó) in 1898 by Béla Vikár.

Twin towns – sister cities

Csurgó is twinned with:

 Aumale, France
 Cristuru Secuiesc, Romania
 Đurđevac, Croatia
 Haimhausen, Germany
 Vráble, Slovakia
 Vrsar, Croatia

Notable residents

 Mordecai Benet born 1753, a Talmudist and chief rabbi of Moravia
 László Szászfalvi (born 1961), Hungarian Calvinist pastor, theologian, politician, mayor of Csurgó (1990 - 2003, 2006 - 2010)
 Ludwig Lichtschein (? - 1886), Hungarian rabbi
 László Faragó (1906 – 1980) military historian, journalist
 Antal Stevanecz (1861 – 1921), Slovene teacher and writer
 Attila Bárkányi (born 1947), Hungarian designer
 Ferenc Beleváry (1801 - 1878), Hungarian Reformed pastor
 Sebestyén Tinódi Lantos (c. 1510 – 1556), Hungarian lyricist, epic poet, political historian, minstrel
 Mihály Csokonai Vitéz (1773 - 1805), Hungarian poet, teacher
 Ernő Kiss Angyal (1899 - 1968), Hungarian composer
 Elemér Nádasdi Sárközy (1900 – 1988), Hungarian painter, restaurateur
 Máté Lajos Csurgói (1931 - 2001), Hungarian painter, graphic designer
 Lajos Nacsa, Hungarian Catholic priest
 Dezső Laky (1887–1962), Hungarian statistician, economist, minister
 József Bokor (1843 – 1917), Hungarian philosopher, author
 Magda Hadik (1914 – 2004), Hungarian sculptor

Gallery

See also 
 Slovenes in Somogy

References 

 Gerő, L. (1984): Magyar műemléki ABC. (Hungarian Architectural Heritage ABC.) Budapest
 Genthon I. (1959): Magyarország műemlékei. (Architectural Heritage of Hungary). Budapest
 Szőnyi O. (É.n.): Régi magyar templomok. Alte Ungarische Kirchen. Anciennes églises Hongroises. Hungarian Churches of Yore. A Műemlékek Országos Bizottsága. Mirályi Magyar Egyetemi Nyomda, Budapest.
 Gerevich T. (1938): Magyarország románkori emlékei. (Die romanische Denkmäler Ungarns.) Egyetemi nyomda. Budapest
 Henszlmann, I. (1876): Magyarország ó-keresztyén, román és átmeneti stylü mű-emlékeinek rövid ismertetése, (Old-Christian, Romanesque and Transitional Style Architecture in Hungary). Királyi Magyar Egyetemi Nyomda, Budapest

External links 

  in Hungarian, English, German and Croatian

Populated places in Somogy County
Romanesque architecture in Hungary